National Democratic Congress (NDC) is a political party in Zambia. It was formed by former Information minister Chishimba Kambwili after he was fired from the ruling Patriotic Front by President  Edgar Lungu in 2016.

Kambwili had been a fierce critic of President Lungu since he was relieved off his duties in 2016. In 2018, the NDC was banned from holding public meetings and Kambwili was arrested for inciting public violence.

In April 2021, Kambwili resigned from the NDC following an internal dispute with party Vice President Joseph Akafumba, and Kambwili has since allied himself once again with the Patriotic Front party.

References

Political parties in Zambia